Iowa Highway 24 (Iowa 24) is a state highway that runs from west to east in northeast Iowa.

Route description

Iowa Highway 24 begins at New Hampton at a freeway interchange with U.S. Highway 63 and U.S. Highway 18.  It goes east through New Hampton, then continues east to Lawler.  It then turns northeast to go through Jackson Junction and Fort Atkinson.  It then continues northeast and ends in Calmar at an intersection with U.S. Highway 52 and Iowa Highway 150.

History
The current version of Iowa Highway 24 is the second occurrence of the route number in the state.  The first lasted from 1920 to 1927 and extended between Council Bluffs and Ottumwa. The present highway came into existence on December 1, 1928.  On October 5, 2002, the highway was extended west through New Hampton as the U.S. 63 freeway bypass opened.

Major intersections

References

024